is a Japanese footballer who plays as midfielder for Veertien Mie.

Club career
Mochizuki made his official debut for Nagoya Grampus in the J1 League, J.League Cup on 24 April 2013 against Kashima Antlers in Kashima Soccer Stadium in Kashima, Japan. He was subbed in the match in the 46th minute for Ryota Isomura. Koyamatsu and his club lost the match 1-0. After one year on loan at Renofa Yamaguchi, he came back to Nagoya just to quit Grampus and sign a new deal with Kyoto Sanga.

After three seasons in Kyoto, he opted to join Veertien Mie in January 2020.

National team career
In June 2011, Mochizuki was elected Japan U-17 national team for 2011 U-17 World Cup and he played 3 matches.

Club statistics
Updated to 3 January 2020.

References

External links 

Profile at Kyoto Sanga
 

1995 births
Living people
Association football people from Shiga Prefecture
Japanese footballers
Japan youth international footballers
J1 League players
J2 League players
J3 League players
Japan Football League players
Nagoya Grampus players
Renofa Yamaguchi FC players
J.League U-22 Selection players
Kyoto Sanga FC players
Veertien Mie players
Association football defenders